{{DISPLAYTITLE:C12H18ClNO}}
The molecular formula C12H18ClNO (molar mass: 227.73 g/mol, exact mass: 227.1077 u) may refer to:

 Tulobuterol
 Etolorex

Molecular formulas